Shalabam is a 2008 Malayalam film by Suresh Palanshery starring Sudheesh, Ramya Nambeeshan, Kaithapram, etc.

Plot 
Hari is the only son of Kumaran who runs a local tea stall in a village. Meera is Hari's childhood friend who still loves to be with children. Meera is not married in spite of many proposals as she has yet to reach maturity.

Meera loves Hari, but Hari only saw her as a friend.  Hari loves another girl Akhila and her father insists that he will marry her off  only to a Government Employee. After Hari gets a Government job, he marries Akhila. The marriage of Hari  makes meera unhappy and she becomes depressed. The superstious villagers started believing that Meera is mentally ill and its bad for the village. The villages threatens Meera and her mother and orders them to vacate the village. The movie ends when Meera finally becomes mature making her and her mother happy.

Cast 
 Sudheesh
 Ramya Nambeeshan
 Kaithapram
 Madambu Kunjikuttan
 Mala Aravindan
 Mamukkoya
 Rajan Padoor 
 KPAC Lalitha
 Bindu Vaarapuzha
 Nilamboor Ayisha

External links 
 
 http://www.nowrunning.com/movie/4139/malayalam/shalabam/index.htm
 https://web.archive.org/web/20090531135314/http://popcorn.oneindia.in/title/555/shalabam.html
 
2000s Malayalam-language films
2008 films